Dick Dale Creek is a stream in Southeast Fairbanks Census Area, Alaska, in the United States.

Prospectors likely bestowed the name Dick Dale Creek, which was recorded by the United States Geological Survey in 1903.

See also
List of rivers of Alaska

References

Rivers of Southeast Fairbanks Census Area, Alaska
Rivers of Alaska
Rivers of Unorganized Borough, Alaska